The Vuelta Internacional Femenina a Costa Rica  is a multi-day bicycle racing stage race held annually in Costa Rica. The race is categorised as 2.2 by the Union Cycliste Internationale (UCI) and has traditionally been run in October, although in 2009 it was held in May. The events are organised by the Federacion Costaricense de Ciclismo.

Previous winners

References

External links

Cycle races in Costa Rica
UCI America Tour races
Spring (season) events in Costa Rica